DXDJ (100.3 FM) is a relay station of RJFM Manila, owned and operated by Rajah Broadcasting Network through its licensee Free Air Broadcasting Network, Inc. The station's transmitter is located at Broadcast Ave., Shrine Hills, Matina, Davao City.

History
The station was established by Rajah Broadcasting Network in 1987 as RJFM. At that time, it aired an album rock format. In 1996, it changed its name to Boss Radio. In the middle of 2003, UMBN took over the station's operations and rebranded the station as 100.3 Oldies Radio with an oldies format, ranging from the 50s, 60s & some 70s. In 2008, it rebranded as Hit Radio and adjusted its music timeline, removing the 50s and adding more 70s & 80s to its playlist. In February 2009, as UMBN's blocktime agreement with the station expired, it became a simulcast of RJFM. Meanwhile, UMBN transferred its operations to ACWS-UBN's DXKR-FM, which became 95.5 Hit Radio.

References

External links
RJFM FB Page

Radio stations in Davao City
Radio stations established in 1987